Buckhaven is a town on the east coast of Fife, Scotland, on the Firth of Forth between East Wemyss and Methil.  Buckhaven is on the Fife Coastal Path, and near to Wemyss Caves and Largo Bay.

History

The name Buckhaven is probably from the Scots terms buck or bukk "to gush out" and haven or "harbour".

Once a thriving weaving village and fishing port, in 1831 it was reported as having the second-largest fishing fleet in Scotland with a total of 198 boats. Fishing declined during the 19th century, but in the 1860s Buckhaven developed more into a mining town. Although coal waste blackened its beaches and silted up its now non-existent harbour, it later became a Fife coast holiday resort and recreation area for locals. Nowadays, it is classed as one of Fife's 'Regeneration areas' in need of regeneration both socially and economically.

The first element is probably related to the Sc verb buck, bukk, ‘to pour forth, gush out’ (DSL), perhaps describing the coastal waters at Buckhaven, which is situated at a point where the Fife coastline swings a little further out into the North Sea. A related element occurs also in Buckie Burn DFL q.v. The second element is certainly Sc haven ‘harbour’, and the ‘fishers of Buckhaven’ are mentioned in the earliest known record from 1527 (Fraser, Wemyss ii no. 187).

In 1778, the minister of Wemyss Parish, Rev. Dr Harry Spens, wrote of his own flock at Buckhaven, ‘... the original inhabitants of Buckhaven were from the Netherlands about the time of Philip II of Spain (died 1598). Their vessel had been stranded on the shore. They proposed to settle and remain. The family of Wemyss gave them permission. They accordingly settled at Buckhaven. By degrees they acquired our language and adopted our dress, and for these threescore years past have had the character of a sober and sensible, an industrious and honest people. The only singularity in their ancient customs that I remember to have heard of was that of a richly ornamented girdle or belt, wore by the brides of good condition and character at their marriage, and then laid aside and given in like manner to the next bride that should be deemed worthy of such an honour. The village consists at present of about 140 families, 60 of which are fishers, the rest land-labourers, weavers and other mechanics.’ (OSA 790–1).

There is no doubt that the people of Buckhaven were regarded as different in speech and manners from surrounding communities, and it is probably in this context that such stories grew up (Millar 1895 ii, 50). One Paul Buk, a Dane, is recommended by the Synod to the Presbytery of Kirkcaldy in 1652 (Stevenson 1900, 384); such local encounters might have confirmed folk in their belief that Buckhaven was foreign.

/bʌkˈhevən/, locally /bʌkˈhain/. This latter pronunciation has given rise to the name of a Buckhaven public house, the Buck and Hind.

According to online sources and authors, the fishing community of Buckhaven is said to have been largely the descendants of Norsemen who settled in the district in the 9th century. Centuries later, Buckhaven's fisherfolk bought an Episcopal Church in St Andrews in 1869 and transported it stone by stone to Buckhaven, using fishing boats. The church was restored in the 1980s and converted into a theatre. Many years before, St Andrews had been combined with the other local Church of Scotland churches into one parish. The building continued to be owned by Buckhaven Parish Church after the conversion.

Buckhaven Museum has displays on the history of the fishing industry.

Census
According to estimates in 2006, the population including Methil stood at around 16,240: however, the Levenmouth area including Kennoway, Leven, the Wemyss villages, Largo Bay and Windygates has a combined population of around 37,410. The population of Buckhaven, Methil, Leven is 24,474, according to the 2011 Census.

Notable people
James Ireland Craig FRSE, meteorologist
Robert Dunsire, recipient of the Victoria Cross
Frank O'Donnell, professional footballer
Hugh O'Donnell, also a professional footballer and brother of Frank O'Donnell
John Houston, artist
William Gear, artist

See also
List of places in Fife

References

External links

Gazetteer for Scotland entry for Buckhaven
Fife Council
Information website on Buckhaven
CLEAR Buckhaven - Actions and local issues of local environmental-civic voluntary association

Towns in Fife
Levenmouth
Fishing communities in Scotland
Port cities and towns in Scotland
Mining communities in Fife